Roger Greenwald is an American poet, translator, and editor based in Toronto, Ontario, Canada.



Biography
Roger Greenwald was born in New Jersey,
where his father, a physicist, worked at the Fort Monmouth Signal Labs. He grew up in New York City
(the Bronx) and graduated from the Bronx High School of Science. In 1966 he received his BA from The
City College of New York, where together with Richard Strier he edited four issues
of the college literary magazine, Promethean, and participated in the weekly Promethean Writers Workshop, which included, among others,
Peter Anson, Robert David Cohen, Samuel R. Delany, Joel Sloman, and Lewis Warsh. Greenwald
then spent one year doing graduate work at New York University and attending the St. Marks in the
Bouwerie Poetry Project Workshop, led by the poet Joel Oppenheimer (assisted by Joel Sloman). Participants there included Sam Abrams, Scott
Cohen, Michael G. Stephens, and Tom Weatherly. After moving to Toronto, Greenwald earned his MA (1969)
and his PhD (1978) in English from the University of Toronto. He taught creative writing, translation,
and composition at Innis College, part of the University of Toronto, until 2006.

In 1970 Greenwald founded the international literary annual WRIT Magazine, which he edited until
it ceased publication in 1995. From 1982 onward, the Canadian poet Richard M. Lush served as associate editor.
The magazine was supported by Innis College and the Ontario Arts Council. Special issues of
WRIT included two devoted entirely to translations; starting with Number 19, each issue featured
one translated writer.
Greenwald was the regional editor for Denmark and Norway (and, with Rika Lesser, for Sápmi)
for the 2008 anthology New European Poets.

Greenwald began writing poetry at the age of eight and was first published when he was in high school. His first notable publication was a
poem that appeared in The World in 1968. In Canada his poetry won the Norma Epstein National
Writing Competition in 1977. He published his first book of poems, Connecting Flight, in 1993. The
next year he was the winner in the poetry category of the CBC Radio / Saturday Night Literary
Awards. His poetry has appeared in many journals, including Panjandrum, Poetry East,
The Spirit That Moves Us, Pequod, Prism International, Leviathan Quarterly, ARS-INTERPRES, and Pleiades.
He won First Prize for Travel Literature in the 2002 CBC Literary Awards competition.

Greenwald is well known as a translator of Scandinavian literature, especially poetry. He has
published three volumes of work by the Norwegian poet Rolf Jacobsen (1907–1994), most recently North in the World: Selected Poems of Rolf Jacobsen, which won the Lewis Galantière Award from the
American Translators Association.  His other major translation from Norwegian is Through Naked Branches: Selected Poems of Tarjei Vesaas, which was shortlisted for the 2001 PEN Award for Poetry in Translation. Further translations of poetry include three books by the Norwegian Poet Paal-Helge Haugen; Picture World, by the Danish poet Niels Frank; and from Swedish, The Time in Malmö on the Earth, by Jacques Werup and Guarding the Air: Selected Poems of Gunnar Harding., Greenwald has also translated two works of fiction from Swedish, the novel A Story about Mr. Silberstein, by the actor and writer Erland Josephson, and I Miss You, I Miss You!, a young-adult novel by Peter Pohl and Kinna Gieth. He has received numerous awards for his translations, including the American Scandinavian Foundation Translation Prize
(twice), the Inger Sjöberg Translation Prize, the F. R. Scott Translation Prize, and the Richard Wilbur Prize.

Bibliography

Poetry
Connecting flight. Toronto: Williams-Wallace, 1993. .

Translations
The silence afterwards. Selected poems of Rolf Jacobsen. Princeton: Princeton University Press, 1985. , . Foreword by Poul Borum; Introduction by Greenwald. Parallel Norwegian and English text
Stone fences. Columbia: University of Missouri Press, 1986. . (With William Mishler.) Translation of Steingjerde, by Paal-Helge Haugen. Introduction by Greenwald. Parallel Norwegian and English text.
The time in Malmö on the earth. Toronto: Exile Editions, 1989. . Translation of Tiden i Malmö, på jorden, by Jacques Werup. Introduction by Greenwald. English only.
A story about Mr. Silberstein. Evanston: Northwestern University Press / Hydra Books, 1995, paperback 2001. , . Translation of En berättelse om herr Silberstein, by Erland Josephson.
Wintering with the Light. Los Angeles: Sun & Moon Press, 1997. . Translation of Det overvintra lyset, by Paal-Helge Haugen. Parallel Norwegian and English text.
Did I know you? Oslo: Gyldendal Norsk Forlag,1997. . Translation of  31 poems by Rolf Jacobsen. Parallel Norwegian and English text.
I miss you, I miss you! New York: R&S Books / Farrar, Straus & Giroux, 1999. .  Translation of Jag saknar dig, jag saknar dig! by Peter Pohl and Kinna Gieth.
Through naked branches. Selected poems of Tarjei Vesaas. Princeton: Princeton University Press, 2000. , . Introduction by Greenwald. Parallel Norwegian and English text.
North in the world. Selected poems of Rolf Jacobsen. Chicago: University of Chicago Press, 2002. . Introduction by Greenwald. Parallel Norwegian and English text.
Picture world. Toronto: BookThug, 2011. . Translation of Én vej, by Niels Frank. English only.
Meditations on Georges de La Tour. Toronto: BookThug, 2013. . Translation of Meditasjonar over Georges de La Tour, by Paal-Helge Haugen. Introduction by Greenwald. Parallel Norwegian and English text.
Guarding the air. Selected poems of Gunnar Harding. Boston: Black Widow Press, 2014. . Introduction by Greenwald. English only.

References

External links
 Roger Greenwald's home page

American male poets
American translators
Norwegian–English translators
City College of New York alumni
University of Toronto alumni
Academic staff of the University of Toronto
People from the Bronx
Living people
Year of birth missing (living people)